Heung Yuen Wai Control Point is a land border control point at the border at Heung Yuen Wai in North District, New Territories, Hong Kong. Its counterpart across the border is Liantang Port in Shenzhen, Guangdong Province. The control point opened for freight trucks on 26 August 2020 and to passengers since 6 February 2023.

History
According to the government, the border control point was needed to relieve the heavily used border control points (like Lo Wu Control Point) to the west. The control point was chosen to be built between Lo Wu Control Point and Sha Tau Kok Control Point.

Opening
Its opening was reported in at least one outlet in May 2019 as scheduled for September 2019. Other reports claimed it would open by the end of 2019.

The opening of the control point was further delayed due to the COVID-19 pandemic, as Hong Kong shut down all border crossings with Shenzhen except the Shenzhen Bay Control Point to control the spread of the virus.

On 21 August 2020, it was announced that the Control Point would be opened on 26 August 2020, albeit for cross-boundary trucks only.

On 6 February 2023, with the lifting of COVID-19 control measures in China, the control point opened to passenger traffic.

Closed Area 
Like all other immigration control points located along the land border of Hong Kong, Heung Yuen Wai Control Point will lie within the Closed Area. Vehicles other than taxis will require a Closed Road Permit to enter.

Transport
A new dual-carriageway access highway, Heung Yuen Wai Highway, was built to link the control point from Fanling Highway, connecting with the Eastern Corridor roadway on the mainland side. The highway comprises viaducts and two tunnels (Cheung Shan Tunnel and Lung Shan Tunnel); the main viaduct was completed on 14 March 2018. The road was expected to open by the end of 2018, but its opening was delayed until 26 May 2019. 3 new bus routes were set up by Citybus and KMB when the control point became open to passengers in 2023, connecting the control point with Sheung Shui, Shatin via Tai Po, and Tuen Mun via Yuen Long (with the latter two only serving on holidays) respectively. At the bus terminus outside, there is also an existing KMB bus route to Sheung Shui via Ta Kwu Ling and Ping Che, as well as a minibus route.

The Control Point is also the first border crossing between Hong Kong and Shenzhen that is accessible to pedestrians and bicycles.

Liantang Control Point in Shenzhen became further accessible from October 2020 onwards via an extension of Shenzhen metro line 2.

References

External links
 Proposal for BCP terminal by WAU

Closed Area
China–Hong Kong border crossings
North District, Hong Kong